RCAF may refer to:

 Royal Cambodian Armed Forces, Cambodia's military, including the army, navy, air force and military police
Royal Cambodian Air Force
 Royal Canadian Air Farce, a comedy troupe which starred in their own radio and television shows
 Royal Canadian Air Force, the name of Canada's air force from 1924 to 1968, and from 2011–Present
 Royal Ceylon Air Force, the Sri Lankan air force from 1948 to 1973
 Royal Chicano Air Force, a collective of artists based in Sacramento, California